The Kodak Easyshare Z612 ZOOM is a consumer digital camera.
It features a Schneider-Kreuznach VARIOGON 35mm-420mm (35mm Equivalent) AF 12x Optical Zoom lens.
One unique feature is its optical image stabilization. It also has an electric viewfinder and a 2.5" LCD screen.

This camera features manual control over the aperture and shutter speed.

See also 
Product Page on kodak website
List of products manufactured by Kodak

Z612